A service delivery framework (SDF) is a set of principles, standards, policies and constraints to be used to guide the designs, development, deployment, operation and retirement of services delivered by a service provider with a view to offering a consistent service experience to a specific user community in a specific business context.  An SDF is the context in which a service provider's capabilities are arranged into services.

The term service delivery framework (SDF) has been used interchangeably with the term service delivery platform (SDP), which is a set of technology components that provide capabilities. An SDF governs and guides the use of SDP capabilities.

Current use

Service delivery frameworks fall into two categories.

 a general reference model for the delivery of services. Such a service delivery framework is developed to be broadly applicable to a particular industry. The TM Forum  Service Delivery Framework, as an example, is developed for the telecommunications industry.
 a more refined reference model for service delivery. This kind of SDF, being more specific, applies to a particular market or service provider. The Immunisation Service Delivery Framework of the District Health Boards of New Zealand offers an example.

Some vendors of service delivery platforms use the term "service delivery framework" to describe their product offerings.

In Context

Accountability for service delivery

The relationship between government and citizens is crucial. Ultimately, government is accountable to citizens for decisions taken. Many countries need to improve the substantive elements of democracy and its checks and balances to ensure that public goods are delivered according to citizens’ expectations. Some methodologies for assessing the extent to which service delivery is accountable have been developed. For instance, the methodology for citizen-led assessment of accountability in service delivery has been developed by the International IDEA.

See also
 Democratic Accountability in Service Delivery: a review of the literature, a self-assessment methodology, and a sample of cases from around the world. The International Institute for Democracy and Electoral Assistance
 Service delivery platform
 Servicescape

External links
 TMForum Service Delivery Framework
 DHBNZ Immunisation Service Delivery Framework

Services marketing